Reiulf Ramstad Arkitekter (RRA) is a Norwegian architecture, landscape architecture, and design firm based in Oslo.

Founded by Reiulf Ramstad in 1995, Reiulf Ramstad Arkitekter is an independent architectural studio with a high level of expertise and a distinct ideology. The firm is focused on interlacing a strong conceptual approach with experience from past accomplished projects. With offices in Oslo, Norway as well as in Aarhus and Copenhagen, Denmark, Reiulf Ramstad Arkitekter is internationally known for its high degree of diverse assignments. 

The projects are geographically spread and take place in a manifold of contexts, from compact urban locations to dramatic and uncultivated landscapes. Reiulf Ramstad Arkitekter portfolio contains commissions with huge contrasts in relation to scale, context, budget, and demands of function. The architecture studio has extensive experience with smaller residential projects as well as large planning proposals, considerate landscape interventions, and complex cultural and educational institutions.

History

Reiulf Ramstad established Reiulf Ramstad Arkitekter in Oslo 1995 to create an architectural practice that would turn conceptual research and practical knowledge into driving forces of sustainable design. Prior to this, he studied and lived for 10 years in Venice, Italy, including studying at the prestigious Istituto Universitario di Architettura di Venezia. For his professional work, he has gained the title of Honorary Fellow of the American Institute of Architects (AIA), performed the role of Vice President of the National Association of Norwegian Architects and gained a professorship at the Oslo School of Architecture and Design.

His collaborator Kristin Stokke Ramstad has an education in Liberal Arts, and now serves as a partner, CEO, and managing director of the office in both Norway and Denmark. She is responsible for the office daily operations, business development, and communication.

Associated partners Christian Skram Fuglset and Anja H. Strandskogen (Oslo) are licensed architects (MNAL) and have a rich wealth of experience across some of the office's most significant projects, including Trollstigen Visitor Centre, Community Church Knarvik, and NTNU Gjøvik.

Thomas Carstens and Per Fischer (MAA) are both Partners at Reiulf Ramstad Arkitekter Denmark, working in close collaboration with the Oslo team across a broad array of projects.

Reiulf Ramstad Arkitekter has a dedicated team of 30 licensed architects, administrative staff, and interns from all around the world. As a prominent Norwegian studio influenced by a strong architectural tradition, the office is now enriched by an international team of diverse and contrasting backgrounds and skill sets.

Reiulf Ramstad Arkitekter has gained considerable attention after the 2012 completion of the Trollstigen National Tourist Route project, now one of Norway's most visited tourist destinations. Since then, it has won numerous awards and recognitions, including the Sundts premie (2009), Jacobprisen (23014), and no less than four nominations to the Mies van der Rohe Award.

Practice
Through a rigorous investigation of place, the office's work looks to amplify the existing strengths of a site in a timeless manner. Everything developed is based on the intersection between quality, time, and economy. No matter the scale or area, these three parameters are always seen in relation to one another to create the best architecture. Using biomimetic and natural materials, the firm's main goal is to create unique buildings derived from logical thinking and decision-making.

In its first 15 years, the studio participated in some 35 open architectural design competitions, often placing first prize. Competition designs included hotels, shopping centers, museums, colleges, and other civic centers. Among constructed prize works are the firm's 2004 proposal for the Metro Oslo Carl Berner, and the 1998 Customs Administration and Office Building at the Gardermoen National Airport.

Style
Influenced by architects like Carlo Scarpa and Sverre Fehn, Reiulf Ramstad Arkitekter style has been classified as revitalized Nordic. To break away from traditional Nordic architecture, RRA draws on natural materials to create different views of nature for users. The firm seeks to establish a new style of Nordic architecture and new ways of experiencing natural areas in its projects.

Design integration
Taking a multidisciplinary approach centered on architecture, the firm also undertakes landscaping work, such as their 2012 cemetery grounds proposal for the Trondheim Church Council, and interior design including furniture. In 2002, the firm won the Museum of Decorative Arts and Design’s competition for the permanent exhibition, "Design and Craft 1905–2005", covering the history of arts and crafts in Norway. RRA's furniture designs, such as their wooden chairs, have been displayed in national and international exhibitions.

Projects

Trollstigen National Tourist Route

One of Reiulf Ramstad Arkitekters better-known projects rests on the Trollstigen plateau and is part of the National Tourist Route. Completed in 2012, the project was the winner of a 2004 competition held by the Norwegian Public Roads Administration.

The structures take up approximately 20,000 square feet on their 2 million square foot landscape, also designed by RRA. They are composed mainly of treated, cast-in-place concrete and corten steel. Although the area can accumulate up to 23 feet of snow, the structures are highly stress-resistant, yet slender. The Tourist Route has been recognized for its environmental design, using durable, sustainable, and locally-sourced materials. The project is now one of Norway's most popular attractions.

Other notable works

 2022: Ski Tårn - Magasinparken, Ski, Norway
 2021: Sagene Trevare - Oslo, Norway
 2020: Breitenbach Landscape Hote (48°Nord) - Breitenbach, France
 2020: Kornets Hus - House of Grain - Hjørring, Denmark
 2020: Pilestredet 77-79 - Oslo, Norway
 2019: Chemin des Carrières - Rosheim, France
 2019: Villa Ask - Oslo, Norway
 2019: Bygdøynesveien 15 - Oslo, Norway
 2017: Miami Sweet Bird South – Miami, USA
 2017: Gjøvik University College - Gjøvik, Norway
 2016: Romsdal Folk Museum – Molde, Norway
 2016: Norwegian Mountaineering Center – Åndalsnes, Norway
 2015: V10 Apartments – Oslo, Norway
 2015: Cultural Center Stjørdal (Kimen) – Stjørdal, Nord-Trondelag, Norway
 2014: Knarvik Community Church – Knarvik, Hordaland, Norway
 2013: Split View Mountain Lodge – Havsdalen, Buskerud, Norway
 2012: Recycling Plant ISI – Baerum, Oslo, Norway
 2012: Trollstigen Visitor Center – Møre og Romsdal, Norway
 2012: Selvika National Tourist Route – Finnmark, Norway
 2011: Trollwall Restaurant and Service – Trollveggen, Møre og Romsdal, Norway
 2011: Summer House – Fuglevik, Norway
 2010: Havøysund National Tourist Route – Havøysund, Finnmark, Norway
 2010: Fagerbørg Kindergarten – Fagerbørg, Oslo, Norway
 2010: Korsgata 5 Urban Apartments – Grünerløkka, Norway
 2008: Villa Heshtagen Asker – Oslo, Norway
 2006: Østfold University College – Østfold, Norway
 2006: Inside-Out Cabin – Papper, Hvaler Islands
 2004: Villa on a Slope – Oslo, Norway
 2003: Villa Holmenkollen – Holmenkollen, Oslo, Norway

Reception
Reiulf Ramstad Arkitekter has frequently received positive reviews for its work on many different types of buildings and has been mentioned in national and global magazines. The firm has also collaborated with several authors on books about the firm. Reiulf Ramstad has collaborated with Boris Jensen and Hatje Cantz on his biography.

Awards

 2021: Grands Prix du Design Awards - Breitenbach Landscape Hotel
 2021: Architizer A+Awards Jury Winner | Multi-Unit Housing Low Rise - Pilestredet 77-79
 2021: DOGA-merket - Chemin des Carrières
 2020: AIA International Region 2020 Design Awards - Pilestredet 77-79 & Chemin des Carrières
 2020: European Architecture Awards | Open Free - Chemin des Carrières
 2020: Architizer A+Awards Jury Winner Architecture +Landscape - Chemin des Carrières
 2020: Murverksprisen (The Norwegian masonry Award) - Pilestredet 77-79
 2020: World Design Awards / Built Landscape Design - Chemin des Carrières
 2020: Re-Thinking the Future Award - Chemin des Carrières
 2019: Architizer A+Awards Jury Winner - Chemin des Carrières
 2019: World Architecture Community Award - Bjørnheimveien Residences
 2018: Trophées des Collectivités d'Alsace - Chemin des Carrières
 2017: Architizer A+Awards Popular Choice & Jury Winner - Romsdal Folk Museum
 2017: European Steel Design Award - Stjørdal Cultural Centre
 2017: Gullhjelmen (The Golden Hard Hat) - NTNU Gjøvik
 2016: Reiulf Ramstad is named Honorary Fellow of the American Institute of Architects (AIA)
 2016: Reiulf Ramstad Architects on Dezeen Hot List
 2016: Inaugural American Architecture Prize - Community Church Knarvik & Trollstigen Visitor Center
 2016: German Design Awards - Knarvik Community Church & Split View Mountain Lodge
 2015: Norwegian Concrete Award - Stjørdal Cultural Center
 2015: Architizer A+ Awards - Firm of the year
 2015: Architizer A+ Awards Popular choice - Knarvik Community Church
 2014: Reiulf Ramstad granted the Jacob-award by the Norwegian Center for Design and Architecture for excellent work within its discipline
 2014: European Concrete Award in the category "Building" – Trollstigen National Tourist Route
 2013: The International Architecture Award – Trollstigen National Tourist Route
 2013: Architizer A+ Awards' most awarded single project, including both Popular choice and Jury awards in two categories – Trollstigen National Tourist Route
 2013: Norwegian Steel Award – Trollstigen National Tourist Route
 2013: European Steel Construction Award – Trollstigen National Tourist Route
 2013: Norwegian Concrete Award – Selvika National Tourist Route
 2012: Norwegian Concrete Award – Trollstigen National Tourist Route
 2012: Topos Jubilee Award – Trollstigen National Tourist Route
 2011: Architizer.com – Firm of the week
 2009: Sundt Price – Fagerborg Kindergarten
 2009: ArchDaily Building of the Year – Trollstigen National Tourist Route

References

External links
 

Architecture firms of Norway
Design companies established in 1995
1995 establishments in Norway